Frederick Haycock may refer to:

Fred Haycock (1886–1955), English footballer for West Bromwich Albion, Lincon City, Port Vale
Freddie Haycock (1912–1989), English footballer for Waterford, Aston Villa, Wrexham